Khuon Sodary (born 8 November 1952) is a Cambodian politician. She is a Member of the National Assembly for Kandal Province and was Second Vice President of the National Assembly from 2012 to 2014.

References

|-
 

1952 births
Living people
Cambodian People's Party politicians
Members of the National Assembly (Cambodia)
People from Battambang province 
Royal University of Phnom Penh alumni